The Geological Museum of the Barcelona Seminary (MGSB) is a Geological Museum situated inside the Barcelona Conciliar Seminary (Barcelona ). The museum was established in 1874 and which works to promote better understanding and studying paleontology. 
The Museu Geològic del Seminari de Barcelona specialization is fossilised invertebrates from different geological periods.

History
Before the existence of the Geological Museum of the Barcelona Seminary, was created the Barcelona Natural History Cabinet of curiosities in 1817.  
The present Museum was founded in 1874 by Jaume Almera i Comas (1845-1919), the first Museum director and depended on the Barcelona Seminary Seminari Conciliar de Barcelona. Since 1885, the Museum  manufactures geological maps of the Province of Barcelona.

Since 1988, the Museum  has edited the Batalleria magazine (about every annual studies) and Scripta Musei Geologici Seminarii Barcinonensis magazine. 
In 1994 was created the Museum Friends Association  (l'associació Amics del Museu Geològic del Seminari de Barcelona/AMGS) to collaborate in studies and the Museum promote.

Actually, the Museum has two halls: the exhibition hall and a new area opened in 2000, this new zone was called "Sala Cardenal Carles" and was created for the younger visitors. This area is necessary because is more didactic and its possible to see recreation figures, taxidermy, fossils or illustrations.

Collection

This Museum is important for it is great collection which has more than 86.576 fossils taxon (December 2020), a library with more than 17.000 books, a laboratory and the historical archive. The institution have a large collection of fossil malacology, corals, sponges, brachiopods, trilobites and others. 
It is important to mention the existence of a large display case with a complete Tetralophodon, in the main exhibition hall. 

The Geological Museum of the Barcelona Seminary contains over 700 fossil holotypes

See also
List of museums in Barcelona

References 

Fossil museums
Natural history museums in Spain
Geology museums in Spain
Museums established in 1874
Paleontology in Spain
Museums in Barcelona